Ya' Ain't Ready is the debut album by Noztra. The album contains a variety of sounds such as Sandungueo, Bolero, Streets/Gangsta Hip Hop and Social themes. All the tracks were written by Noztra and the album was produced by some of the top producers in the market such as: Luny Tunes, Nesty, DJ Urba, Monserrate, DJ Sonic, Notty-Mekka, Myztiko and A & X.

The first single off this album is "El Maquinon", which was produced by DJ Urba & Monserrate

Track listing
 "Intro (Ya Ain't Ready)
 "Bailar Reggaeton
 "La Disco Explota
 "El Maquinon
 "Cuentale - (featuring Cheo)
 "Dame Un Minuto
 "Damelo Duro - (featuring Rosandi)
 "Te Haces La Dificil
 "Ammo Musik - (featuring Calvo/Medizina)
 "Me Huele A Guerra
 "La Matadora
 "La Perreta
 "Te Quize Amar - (featuring Erin V.)
 "Me Desespera
 "Velocidad
 "Suelta La Lengua - (with Calvo)
 "La Disco Explota - (Merengue remix)
 "La Hora De Joder
 "Cuantos Anos Pasarn
 "Pingas

2005 debut albums
Reggaeton albums
Albums produced by Luny Tunes